The Curtis, also known as the Executive Tower, is a 350 ft (107m) tall skyscraper in Denver, Colorado. It was completed in 1974 and has 30 floors. It is the 31st tallest building in the city. The Curtis Hotel became a member of the Hilton family on January 5, 2010.  It is now called The Curtis-A Doubletree Hotel.  Since 2006, the hotel has also functioned as a student dormitory for the nearby Auraria Campus. The housing is known as the "Auraria Student Lofts" and occupies Floors 17–30.

See also
List of tallest buildings in Denver

References

Emporis
Skyscraperpage

Residential buildings completed in 1974
Skyscraper hotels in Denver